Bhathiji also called Bhathiji Maharaj (as an honorific) is a folk deity of Gujarat.  He is an eminent warrior-hero of the region.

Legend
As per the folklore, Bhathi was the second son of Thakore  Takhatsinghji of fagvel born in Rathod branch of Rajput clan.  While he was marrying Kankubaa and was completing the fourth of the seventh fera, he came to know that Muslim king of Kapadvanj, receiving a complaint against him had impounded the mother Gaus (Cow) of the village. Bhathiji immediately left riding a horse with his sword, leaving the marriage incomplete. He released the cow and defeated the army, but his head was severed from his body. He died as martyr but was able to free the cattle. There are folk songs of how Bhatihiji's headless body continued to fight the Muslim raiders till all of them were wiped out.

Legacy
Bhathiji is ever since worshipped as a folk deity as a protector of cow and followers believe, those who worship Bhathiji are protected also from  bites of snakes, cobras and scorpions.  The Rathod Rajputs  of Saurashtra worship his as kuladevata

Further, most of the Bhuas - irrespective of castes that they belong to, worship Bhathiji Maharaj. Bhathiji is worshiped by Hindus to cure ill livestock and family members. Bhuva, the priest of is approached for diagnosis and curing of disease among men and animals. When a family member, a cow, a buffalo etc. falls ill or dies, it is believed that the spirit of an ancestor had been annoyed because of neglect of timely worship, lack of offering ritual food and respect. When someone is harassed by an evil spirit, the Bhuva of is consulted. If the evil spirit tries to evade the commands of Vachhada Dada, the bhuva threatens to punish the spirit by inciting against it the wrath of this powerful deity.

The iconography of Bhatihiji is of a male warrior that rides a horse wielding a sword in his right hand.

In Davda village of Kheda district of Gujarat, reds of worshippers of Bhathiji, Hindus as well as Muslims, line up there every Friday to seek the blessings of the deity and the priest, and take a vow to renounce liquor.

There are five other fairs dedicated to Bhathiji are organised; at Davda village in Nadiad taluka on 5 December; at Mahmedpura in Nadiad taluka, Fagvel in Kapadvanj taluka, Kanij in Mahemadabad taluka and Valasan in Anand taluka on 2nd day of shukla paksha of Hindu calendar month of Kartik.

In 2002, Narendra Modi, then the Gujarat chief Minister, flagged off his Gaurav Yatra from Bhathiji Temeple at Phagvel.

There also exists, an organisation of the Kshatriya followers of Bhathiji called Bhathiji Sena.

A film about him was directed by Shantilal Soni and released in 1980 named Bhathiji na Mandire in 1980 and Bhathiji Maharaj in 1990, both in Gujarati. Also there are musical albums of bhajans and songs in his reverence available sung by local as well as known artists like Alka Yagnik.

See also
Vachara Dada

References

Regional Hindu gods
Hindu folk deities